Percy Beart Thomas CIE (1866 – 15 August 1921) was a British police officer in India.

Thomas was the son of the rector of Hamerton, Huntingdonshire. He was educated at Shrewsbury School and then joined the Indian Police Service, rising to be Inspector-General of Police of Madras.

He was appointed Companion of the Order of the Indian Empire (CIE) in the 1921 Birthday Honours.

Thomas died suddenly while on leave in Britain a few months before his retirement.

See also
William Beach Thomas

References
Obituary, The Times, 17 August 1921

1866 births
1921 deaths
People from Hamerton
People educated at Shrewsbury School
Indian Police Service officers in British India
Indian police chiefs
Companions of the Order of the Indian Empire